Bellevue House was an 18th-century country house set in its own 300 acre (120 ha) demesne, in the village of Delgany, County Wicklow. It is 25 km (16 miles) south of the Dublin. The house was built on an estate originally called Ballydonagh, after the townland which borders it to the south west. It was demolished in the 1950s. Delgany Golf Club is now located on the estate.

The house had extensive gardens with winding paths, large glasshouses and panoramic views across the Glen of the Downs (a wooded valley to the west) and across farmland eastward to the Irish Sea.

History
The Ballydonagh demesne was bought in 1753 by David La Touche, a rich banker from Dublin of Huguenot extraction from his friend, Richard Chevenix Trench, the Anglican Archbishop of Dublin. He built a house between 1754 and 1756 at a cost of £30,000 and named it Bellevue. In 1785 it was inherited by his son Peter, who moved in after in 1786 his wife Rebecca Vicars died and he married her cousin Elizabeth Vicars. Peter La Touche built the church in Delgany in 1789 and his wife opened an orphanage and school for female children in the grounds of Bellevue. He died in 1828.

The estate was inherited by his nephew Peter La Touche, of Marley, County Dublin and previously the Member of Parliament for County Leitrim. Peter died two years later and it passed to his eldest son Peter David, who donated land to build St Patrick's church in nearby Greystones. Peter David died in 1857 and Bellevue then passed to his brother William Robert who lived until 1892. After William Robert the estate went to his brother Octavius and then to Octavius' son Peter, a major in the Royal Dublin Fusiliers. He died in 1904 and the estate was divided between his widow and his three sisters, one of whom, Frances, moved into Bellevue with her husband Dr Archer.

The family then ran into financial difficulties and finally left Bellevue in 1913 after which the house fell into decay and was pulled down in the
early 1950s. Part of the land was taken over by the Forestry Division of the Department of Lands.

References

 
 

Buildings and structures in County Wicklow
Demolished buildings and structures in the Republic of Ireland
Buildings and structures demolished in the 1950s